The little desert pocket mouse (Chaetodipus arenarius) is a species of small rodent in the family Heteromyidae. It is endemic to Baja California in Mexico.

Description
The fur is soft and fairly silky and there are none of the spines found in some related species though there may be a few soft bristles on the rump. The ears are dark and there is a tiny patch of white hairs at their base. The color of the dorsal surface varies from pale gray or pale buff to dark brown, and there may be some dark-tipped guard hairs giving a grizzled appearance. The upper half of the tail matches the dorsal color while the underparts of the body, the feet and lower side of the tail are white or cream-colored. There may be a buff-colored line separating the upper parts from the underparts, but it is faint or missing in some populations.

Distribution and habitat
The little desert pocket mouse is endemic to Mexico. Its range includes the Baja California peninsula, Jacques Cousteau Island and Magdalena Island. Its typical habitat is arid flat areas with scant vegetation and loose, dry, sandy soils but it is also found on slopes and ridges, and even the floors of dried up riverbeds.

Ecology
Very little is known about the natural history and behavior of this pocket mouse. It lives in a burrow and seems to have an affinity for sandy soils. Its breeding habits are not known but a female specimen containing two embryos was caught in March. Its main predator is the barn owl (Tyto alba).

Status
Although the population trend of the little desert pocket mouse has not been evaluated, it is common in suitable habitat within its range and does not appear to face any specific threat. In view of this and its presumed large total population, the International Union for Conservation of Nature has assessed its conservation status as being of "least concern".

References

Chaetodipus
Endemic mammals of Mexico
Mammals described in 1894
Taxonomy articles created by Polbot
Endemic fauna of the Baja California Peninsula